One More Mem'ry is an album by saxophonist/composer Benny Golson that was recorded in 1981 and released on the Japanese Baystate label the following year. The album features trombonist Curtis Fuller and was reissued on the Dutch Timeless label in 1984.

Track listing 
All compositions by Benny Golson except where noted
 "One More Mem'ry" – 8:32
 "Out of the Past" – 8:27
 "Sweetness" (Curtis Fuller) – 6:44
 "Five Spot After Dark" – 6:05
 "Touch Me Lightly" – 6:03
 "Sad to Say" – 7:04
 "Once Again" – 4:04

Personnel 
Benny Golson – tenor saxophone
Curtis Fuller – trombone
Bill Mays – piano
Bob Magnusson - bass 
Roy McCurdy – drums

Production
Makoto Kimata – producer
Kenny Present – engineer

References 

Benny Golson albums
1982 albums
Baystate Records albums
Timeless Records albums